Buena Vista Historic District is a historic neighborhood in Nashville, Tennessee. It was listed on the National Register of Historic Places listings in Davidson County, Tennessee (NRHP) in 1980.

History

It is a 10 block area with 223 structures. There are tree-lined avenues and sidewalks constructed of bricks. Within the district are several school buildings, churches, a library and commercial buildings. The neighborhood was formed during the late nineteenth and early twentieth centuries and the structures feature many different architectural styles.

The district was added to the National Register of Historic Places listings in Davidson County, Tennessee on April 24, 1980. The district is found Interstate 265 in Tennessee and U.S. Route 41.

In 2018 the News channel 5 Nashville reported that the neighborhood was becoming unaffordable. Developers had begun constructing expensive homes and residents were forced to pay higher property taxes.

A tornado destroyed a 108-year-old structure called the Hopewell Baptist Church in Buena Vista. It was subsequently rebuilt and it reopened In 2022. The church was an important Buena Vista landmark because it was frequented by German and African American people of North Nashville and it was designed by notable architect Henry Gibel.

References

1870 establishments in Tennessee
National Register of Historic Places in Nashville, Tennessee
Historic districts on the National Register of Historic Places in Tennessee
Neighborhoods in Nashville, Tennessee
Populated places in Davidson County, Tennessee